Fa'ato'ialemanu is a village on the island of Upolu in Samoa. It is situated on the north central side of the island and is part of the greater Apia area. The village has a population of 841.

The village is in the political district of Tuamasaga.

References

Populated places in Tuamasaga